Delta Air Lines Flight 1080 was a scheduled flight notable for the incident that occurred on April 12, 1977 during the San Diego to Los Angeles leg of the flight. Unknown to the crew, the Lockheed L-1011's left elevator had become stuck in a fully upwards position. This led to the aircraft pitching up aggressively and causing the aircraft to lose speed and nearly stall. The pitching force, unable to be overcome by fully pushing the control column down, was counteracted by reducing the thrust on the L-1011's wing engines but not the tail engine. The differential thrust, along with moving all the passengers as far forwards as possible in the cabin, pitched down the nose of the airliner and allowed the pilots to land the aircraft.

An investigation found that the pressurization and depressurization of the L-1011 during flight cycles had caused water to be pushed inside a bearing, heavily corroding it and causing it to become jammed during a routine control surfaces check prior to takeoff. The FAA issued an emergency airworthiness directive instructing airlines to do a check of the bearing. This verification, however, was not sufficient to prevent takeoff with a jammed elevator; and a similar incident followed two months later. The FAA then made it mandatory for crews to inspect the elevators before each takeoff.

As a result of the incidents, Lockheed redesigned the elevator systems to be redundant upon failure of the bearings, as well as adding a seal to the bearing and a deflector to reduce the amount of water contacting the part. Lockheed also modified the pilot's manual to improve the Pitch Axis Control Assist Procedures. The FAA further made it mandatory for pilots to be informed of these changes.

For his skill in landing the crippled airplane, the captain, Jack McMahan, was awarded the FAA's Distinguished Service Award. The airplane was repaired and continued to fly for Delta until 1985. It was subsequently sold to American Trans Air, where it was registered with the tail number "N187AT". The airplane was scrapped in 2002.

See also
Alaska Airlines Flight 261, another improperly greased stabilizer that jammed, leading to the deaths of 88 people.

References

External links
portrait of N707DA the accident aircraft taking off

 
Delta Air Lines accidents and incidents
Accidents and incidents involving the Lockheed L-1011
Aviation accidents and incidents in California
Aviation accidents and incidents in 1977
Aviation accidents and incidents in the United States in 1977
April 1977 events in the United States